Albert Levy (1847 – 1931) was a French photographer active in Europe and the United States. Most active in the 1880s and 1890s, he was a pioneer of architectural photography.

He developed a catalogue with 2500 titles that is available through the Gallica web project of the Bibliothèque nationale de France (BnF) as well as in the Avery Architectural and Fine Arts Library. His catalogue covers France, Italy, Germany, United Kingdom, Austria, the Netherlands, Switzerland and the United States.
He was one of the first photographers to have studios on both sides of the Atlantic Ocean: in Paris and New York.

His main contribution to history documentation was his "Albert Levy's architectural photographic Series" in the 1870s that consists of albums with 30–40 albumen prints of the Architecture of the United States, with a size of 20x24 cm approximately. There are at least 36 series.

Biography
Levy was born in Paris in 1847 and died in Asnières-sur-Seine. However, the 1880 United States Census notes that he was 33 years old, which would put his birth date at 1847 if he was asked his "age on your birthday anniversary in 1880". Alternatively, it could be either 1846 or 1847 if asked for his age at the time of being asked (which could be before or after his birthday anniversary in 1880). The New York Passengers list 1820–1957 indicates that he came to the United States in 1876 and that his occupation was photographer. The 1880 Census gives his profession as bookseller.

Occupation
There are indications that Albert Levy was a photographer who also worked variously as bookseller, editor, and manufacturer.
His main occupation was photographer. Active between 1870s-1890s, he worked in France in 1876 and in the United States in the 1880s and 1890s.
He was one of the few photographers to have two studios at the same time in America and Europe. Actually, he had several studios:
 77 University Place, New York
 4 Bond Street, New York in 1880
  Pine Street, New York in 1887
 19 rue de la Chaussée-d'Antin, Paris
 22 janvier 1901, A. Lévy, 4 av. Pinel, Asnières

Apart from photographer and bookseller, he was also pioneer in the manufacture of the gelatin dry plates in 1878.
Because of the work he developed, he was an early competitor of George Eastman. He published several ads on "The Philadelphia Photographer" before Eastman's patent (1879):
 Levy's Emulsion Photographique Francaise Advertisement.
[...] Unequalled for rapidity (fully equal to the both plate) intensity to any degree on simple development without silver or other intensifier and absolutely permanent and without change. Albert Levy sole proprietor. Preservative for dry plates (more rapid than wet) [...]
 Levy's Dry Plates
 Levy's Cyanotipes.
 Levy's Emulsion Dry Plate Camera.

Finally, he was an editor whose catalogue is in the Bibliothèque nationale de France(BnF) and in the Avery Architectural and Fine Arts Library.

Photography

The main occupation of Albert Levy was Architectural photography. He developed most of his work in the 1870s. He started working in Europe and then he moved to the United States when he was 33 years old, but he still worked in Europe. His catalogue of 1887 (with 2500 titles) demonstrates that he did architectural photography in France, Italy, Germany, United Kingdom, Austria, the Netherlands, Switzerland and the United States.
The took albumen photographies that collected with the following standards:
 Albumen 20x24 cm
 Cardboard 29x41 cm
 Albums with 30-40 photos each
He focused his work on the new buildings of important architects like:
 Herter Brothers - Twin Houses, New York
 Richard Morris Hunt - William Kissam Vanderbilt Residence, New York
 George Browne Post - Cornelius Vanderbilt Residence, New York
 Henry Hobson Richardson - Oakes Ames Memorial Library, North Easton, Massachusetts
 Calvert Vaux - Samuel J. Tilden Residence, New York
 Charles B. Atwood - Dr. Stewart Webb and H. McKinley Twombly residences, New York (originally for William Henry Vanderbilt)
 C. Pfeifer - The Berkshires, New York
 E. H. Kendall - Odgen Goelet residence, New York
 R.H.Robertson
 Peabody and Stearns
 Viollet le Duc
 William Le Baron Jenney
 Guerinot

Important owners of the buildings he took photos are William Henry Vanderbilt, Cornelius Vanderbilt, William Kissam Vanderbilt, Samuel J. Tilden, Oliver Ames, John Harjés.

His most important contribution to history consists on the "Albert Levy's Architectural photographic series" that are a collection of at least 36 albums with 30-40 albumen prints of the architecture of the United States and Europe in the 1870s. In these series there are photos of Washington, Baltimore, Boston, New York, Philadelphia, Albany, Chicago, Cleveland,  Buffalo, Detroit, Milwaukee, Zurich, Berna, Berlin and cities of France among others.
He used to create the series depending on the type of buildings been photographed. Some of the series are:
 Albert Levy's Photographic Series of Modern American Architecture: First Series, Private City Dwellings.
 Albert Levy's Photographic Series of Modern American Architecture: Second Series, Country Dwellings.
 Albert Levy's Photographic Series of Modern American Architecture: Third series, French Gothic and Renaissance, Civil and Domestic Architecture, New York
 Albert Levy's Photographic Series of Modern American Architecture: Fifth Series, Messrs. Vanderbilt's Mansions
 Albert Levy's Photographic Series of Modern American Architecture: Ninth Series, Street Fronts.
 Albert Levy's Photographic Series of Modern American Architecture: Tenth Series, Sea Shore Cottages and Country Houses
 Albert Levy's Architectural Photographic Series: Twelfth Series, Modern Street Architecture of Berlin, Street Fronts and Apartment Houses.
 Albert Levy's Architectural Photographic Series: Fourteenth Series: Romanesque and Gothic Churches in the South of France
 Albert Levy's Photographic Series of Modern American Architecture: Sixteenth Series, American Private City Dwellings
 Albert Levy's Architectural Photographic Series: Twenty-fourth series, Berne, Lucerne, Zurich and other Swiss cities and towns
 Albert Levy's Photographic Series of Modern American Architecture: Thirty-First Series, Street Fronts, Stores, Office Buildings, Etc.
 Albert Levy's Photographic Series of Modern American Architecture: Thirty-Third series, American City and Country Residences, etc., New York.
 Albert Levy's Photographic Series of Modern American Architecture: Thirty-Fifth Series, Sea Shore Cottages And Country Houses, Bar Harbor, Mount Desert, Maine
 Albert Levy's Photographic Series of Modern American Architecture: Thirty-Sixth Series, Sea-Shore Cottages, Etc., Newport, R.I., And Long Branch, N.J

A selection of this unique archive of Europe's and American Architecture in the 19th century was lately edited by Andre, Daly fils et Cie. (French editors specialized in Architecture) to collect the best of the Albert Levy's architectural series in the album "L'Architecture Americaine" and show it in Europe. This collection consists of 3 series of albums:
 1st Series: Public Buildings
 2nd Series: Private Urban Residences
 3rd Series: Suburban Homes
Each serie has 36 photos. All of them are described in the book "American Victorian Architecture".

He participated in the Centennial International Exhibition of 1876 in Philadelphia

Artwork holders
The main holders of his photos are:
 Architektur Sammlung of the Technische Hochschule in Munich
 Art Institute of Chicago
 Avery Architectural and Fine Arts Library
 Bibliothèque nationale de France(BnF)
 Boston Public Library
 Centre Canadien d'Architecture
 George Eastman House
 J. Paul Getty Museum
 Library of Congress of the United States
 Metropolitan Museum
 Ministère de Culture France
 Santa Barbara Museum of Art
 University of Louisville
 University of Wisconsin–Milwaukee

Samples
Some examples of his work can be found at the HALIC (Historical Architecture and Landscape Image Collection) of the Art Institute of Chicago. Search for "Albert Levy".

References

External links
 Photos by Albert Levy at the HALIC archive of the Art Institute of Chicago
 Images of "L'architecture americaine", 1886
 Scans of Albert Levy's catalogue at the Biliotheque Nacionale de France (BnF)

1847 births
1931 deaths
Pioneers of photography
French photographers
Photographers from New York (state)
Architectural photographers